Rise & Shine is former Small Faces and Faces keyboardist Ian McLagan's fourth album, recorded by McLagan with his backing group, the Bump Band, featuring Gurf Morlix and "Scrappy" Jud Newcomb on guitars, Don Harvey on drums and George Reiff on bass. Recorded at McLagan's Manor, Texas studio, The Doghouse, it featured eleven tracks of original material, ten new and one overhauled from McLagan's 1985 EP, Last Chance to Dance. Featured on several tracks is Patty Griffin singing backing vocals.

Track listing
All tracks composed by Ian McLagan

 "You're My Girl" (2:41)
 "Been a Long Time" (3:23)
 "Date With an Angel" (4:32)
 "Anytime" (5:07)
 "Price of Love" (5:05)
 "She Ain't My Girl" (4:08)
 "Your Secret" (3:11)
 "Lying" (3:56)
 "The Wrong Direction" (3:33)
 "Rubies in Her Hair" (4:17)
 "Wishing Hoping Dreaming" (5:18)

Personnel

The Bump Band
 Ian McLagan - vocals, acoustic and electric pianos, Hammond B2 and B3 organs, acoustic and electric guitars, bass guitar, percussion
 Gurf Morlix - electric guitars (right channel), vocals
 "Scrappy" Jud Newcomb - electric and acoustic guitars (left channel), vocals
 George Reiff - bass guitars, vocals
 Don Harvey - drums, percussion, occasional vocal
with:
 Patty Griffin - vocals (4, 8, 9, 11)
 Brian Standefer - cellos (4, 8)
 John Bush - congas, percussion (6, 11)
The Texacali Horns
 Joe Sublett - tenor saxophone (5)
 Darrell Leonard - trumpet (5)

References

Additional sources
Paste magazine review
Popmatters review
No Depression review
The Austin Chronicle review

2004 albums
Ian McLagan albums
Sanctuary Records albums